WOCO (1260 AM) is a radio station  broadcasting a country music format. Licensed to Oconto, Wisconsin, United States.  The station is currently owned by Lamardo Inc.

References

External links

OCO
Country radio stations in the United States